The Australian owlet-nightjar (Aegotheles cristatus) is a nocturnal bird found in open woodland across Australia and in southern New Guinea. It is colloquially known as the moth owl. It is the most common nocturnal bird in Australia, and despite suffering from predation and competition by introduced species it is not considered threatened.

Description and habitats

The Australian owlet-nightjar is a small to medium-sized owlet-nightjar with grey upperparts and a white, barred front and a distinct dark and pale patterning on the head. In the north of Australia females can also have a rufous morph. The plumage is overall paler in desert populations.   Australian owlet-nightjar's are adapted to live in open woodland, with more pointed wings and larger feet, unlike most of the rest of the family that live in dense forest (though some individuals of this species can and do live in such habitat in Queensland and New Guinea). It lives in a variety of habitats in addition to open woodland, including mangrove swamps, grasslands, mallee scrub and dense forest.

Behavior
The Australian owlet-nightjar feeds at night by diving from perches and snatching insects from the air, ground or off trunks and branches, in the manner of a flycatcher. It may also feed on the wing. It feeds on most insects, particularly beetles, grasshoppers and ants. During the day they roost in hollows in trees, partly for protection from predators and partly to avoid being mobbed by other birds that mistake them for owls.

The Australian owlet-nightjar nests mainly in holes in trees (or in other holes and crevices), which is provisioned with leaves by both of the pair. It is thought that the frequent addition of eucalyptus leaves is because they act as a beneficial insecticide. Three or four eggs are laid, and incubated by the female for just under a month. Both the adults feed the chicks, which fledge after a month. The young birds are reported to stay close to the parents for several months after they fledge.

The species is itself prey to another nocturnal carnivore, Macroderma gigas, a larger microchiropteran known as the ghost bat.

References

External links

 Aegotheles cristatus cristatus Australian Faunal Directory

Australian owlet-nightjar
Australian owlet-nightjar
Australian owlet-nightjar
Birds of prey of New Guinea
Australian owlet-nightjar
Taxa named by George Shaw